Yien Yieh Commercial Bank was a bank in Hong Kong.  It was established in Beijing in 1915 by Mr. Zhang Zhenfang, the cousin of Yuan Shikai, to support the specialized salt industry by providing official funds under government supervision. Yien Yieh Commercial Bank, Continental Bank, Kincheng Banking Corporation and China & South Sea Bank were called "four northern banks" in 1920s in China.

In 1952, it was grouped into the "Joint Office of Joint Public-Private Banks" with eight other Chinese banks.  In 2001, it was merged to form Bank of China (Hong Kong).

See others 

Salt in Chinese history
Four Northern Banks

References

Companies based in Beijing
Defunct banks of China
Defunct banks of Hong Kong
Bank of China
Banks disestablished in 2001
Banks established in 1915